Actinommidae is a family of radiolarians.

Genera 
According to the World Register of Marine Species, the following genera are accepted within Actinommidae:

 Acanthosphaera Ehrenberg, 1858
 Actinomma Haeckel, 1860, emend. Nigrini, 1967
 Actinosphaera
 Amphisphaera
 Anomalacantha Loeblich & Tappan, 1961
 Arachnosphaera
 Astrosphaera
 Axoprunum Haeckel, 1887
 Carposphaera
 Cenosphaera Ehrenberg, 1854
 Centracontarium
 Centrocubus
 Centrolonche
 Cladococcus
 Cromyechinus
 Cromyomma
 Cyrtidosphaera
 Diploplegma
 Dorydruppa
 Druppatractus
 Drymosphaera
 Drymyomma
 Echinomma
 Elatomma
 Ellipsoxiphium
 Gonosphaera
 Haeckeliella
 Haliomma Ehrenberg, 1839
 Heliaster Hollande & Enjumet, 1960
 Heliosoma
 Heliosphaera
 Hexacontium Haeckel, 1881
 Hexacromyum
 Hexalonche
 Hexastylus
 Leptosphaera
 Liosphaera
 Lonchosphaera
 Lychnosphaera
 Octodendron
 Ommatartus Haeckel, 1881, emend. Riedel, 1971
 Plegmosphaera
 Rhizoplegma
 Saturnalis
 Sphaeropyle
 Spongodictyon
 Spongodrymus
 Spongoplegma
 Spongosphaera
 Stigmosphaera
 Stylacontarium
 Stylatractus Haeckel, 1887
 Stylosphaera
 Styptosphaera Haeckel, 1887
 Tetrapetalon
 Thecosphaera
 Trilobatum
 Xiphatractus
 Xiphosphaera

References

Radiolarian families